The Aguascalientes City Museum (Spanish: Museo de Aguascalientes) is located in the City of Aguascalientes, in the state of Aguascalientes Mexico, as the premier art museum in the city.

Building
It was built in 1903 by Refugio Reyes Rivas in a neoclassical style.  Its facade outstands as a Greek Temple made out of groove capitals and columns. It is built in pink quarry. The interior is composed of two yards; the first yard has carved columns; and the second yard has central quarry fountains, work of José Refugio Reyes Rivas. It has capital columns and arcs.

History
Used to be known as “Escuela Normal del Estado” (State Teaching School) when built in 1903, and it was enlarged from 1915 to 1916, it became a museum due to the IV centenary of the foundation of the city, in October 1975 the state open the museum in this edification after being condition for this use. The reason to turn this place into a museum was to recognize the work of the most outstanding plastic artists of Aguascalientes.

The displays
The art museum contains works of many paintings and sculptures.  Is possible to admire some of the most beautiful sculptures of Jesús F. Contreras, like a plastic fiber reproduction of the Malgre Tout sculpture (the original is in the Museo Nacional de Arte, Mexico City). This work was internationally awarded in Paris, France; the name of the sculpture was given to it, due to the amputation of the right arm of the artist. Consequence to an infection before finishing its masterpiece. 
There are also exhibitions from the work of Francisco Díaz de León, paintings by Gabriel Fernández Ledesma and the work of Saturnino Herrán "El más pintor de los mexicanos y más mexicano de los pintores" ("the most painter of the Mexican and the most Mexican of the painters"). There are temporal contemporarily painting and sculpture exhibitions all year long.

External links

 Webpage about the museum 

Art museums and galleries in Mexico
Museums in Aguascalientes
Aguascalientes City
1975 establishments in Mexico
Art museums established in 1975